Rupe may refer to:

Places:
Rupe, Mozambique, a settlement in Mozambique
Rupe, Celje, a village in the City Municipality of Celje, eastern Slovenia
Rupe, Velike Lašče, a village in the Municipality of Velike Lašče, southern Slovenia
Rupe pri Selu, a former village in Jarčja Dolina, Municipality of Žiri, northwestern Slovenia

People:
 Rupe (surname)
 Rupe (given name)

See also
 Rupe, Rupe, an 1899 work by Paul Gauguin - see Two Tahitian Women